Ys is a mythical sunken city in Brittany, France.

YS or ys may also refer to:

Arts and entertainment

Games and anime
Ys (series), a video game series
Ys I: Ancient Ys Vanished, or simply Ys, the first game in the series
Ys (anime), anime OVA series based on the first two Ys video games
Other Ys media

Music
Ys (Joanna Newsom album), 2006
 Ys, a 1972 album by Neapolitan progressive rock band Il Balletto di Bronzo
"Ys", a 1972 song by Alan Stivell from Renaissance of the Celtic Harp
"Yellow Submarine", a 1966 song by the Beatles with the initials "Y.S."

Other media
 Your Sinclair, a British computer magazine

Businesses and organizations
 Confederation of Vocational Unions, abbreviated YS in Norwegian
 Esat Young Scientist and Technology Exhibition, an Irish annual school students' science competition
 Proteus Airlines (IATA airline code YS)
 Régional (IATA airline code YS)
 Youngstown and Southeastern Railroad (reporting mark YS)

People
 Etienne Ys (born 1962), Netherlands Antilles politician
 Kim Young-sam, 14th president of Republic of Korea

Places
 Ys, a mythical sunken city in Brittany, France.
 Y.S. River, in the island of Jamaica

Science
 Yoctosecond, or ys, a unit of time equal to 10−24 seconds
 Yottasecond, or Ys, a unit of time equal to 1024 seconds